ALM (formerly American Lawyer Media) is a media company headquartered in the Socony–Mobil Building in New York City, and is a provider of specialized business news and information, focused primarily on the legal, insurance, and commercial real estate sectors. The company was started in 1979 by Steven Brill to publish The American Lawyer.

Organization 
ALM owns and publishes 33 national, regional, and international magazines and newspapers, including Credit Union Times, The American Lawyer, the New York Law Journal, Corporate Counsel, The National Law Journal, The Legal Intelligencer, Legal Times, GlobeSt.com, and Real Estate Forum, as well as the Law.com and Law.com International brands. 

The company also produces conferences and trade shows for business leaders and the legal profession. Law Journal Press, ALM's professional book imprint, publishes over 130 treatises on a broad range of legal topics. Other ALM businesses include newsletter publishing, court verdict and settlement reporting, production of professional educational seminars, market research, and content distribution.

History 
In 1997, Brill sold ALM to Time Warner, mainly for its CourtTV stake. ALM's legal publications were acquired from Time Warner by U.S. Equity Partners, L.P., a private equity fund sponsored by Wasserstein & Co., L.P., in 1998. Shortly afterward, it acquired National Law Publishing Company (parent of The National Law Journal and New York Law Journal) from Boston Ventures and the legal publications of Legal Communications (including The Legal Intelligencer) from Meridian Venture Partners. 

In 1999, U.S. Equity bought real estate publisher Schein Publications.

In 2007, ALM was purchased by Incisive Media for  million. Two years later, Incisive had to restructure the loan used to purchase ALM, and ALM once again became an independent company, owned by the lenders and Apax Partners. Wasserstein & Co. repurchased ALM in 2014. 

In 2015, ALM acquired Summit Professional Networks. 

In January 2016, the company acquired British legal magazine Legal Week.

Publications
 The American Lawyer
 Credit Union Times
 The Legal Intelligencer
 The National Law Journal
 New York Law Journal
 ThinkAdvisor
 Law Journal Press
 Litigation Daily
 Legaltech News
 The Supreme Court Brief
 The Recorder
 Connecticut Law Tribune
 Delaware Law Weekly
 Texas Lawyer
 New Jersey Law Journal

References

External links

American Lawyer Media Holdings in the International Directory of Company Histories, 2000.

 
1979 establishments in New York City
American companies established in 1979
Publishing companies established in 1979
1997 mergers and acquisitions
1998 mergers and acquisitions
2007 mergers and acquisitions
2009 mergers and acquisitions
2014 mergers and acquisitions
Legal publishers
Publishing companies based in New York City
Former Time Warner subsidiaries